Theofilos Vernezis (1938 – February 1998) was a Greek footballer who played as a defender.

Early life
Vernezis from a young age excelled in all his sporting activities. From the mid-50's he played basketball at Ionikos Nea Filadelfeia, while he was also involved in athletics and played football ta the academies of AEK Athens. He eventually chose football over the other sporting activities due to his love for AEK.

Club career
Vernezis was promoted to the men's team in 1956 under Kostas Negrepontis. He mainly played as a right or center back, but due to his athletic physique, he could also compete successfully as a goalkeeper, replacing the injured Stelios Serafidis. He holds the record of being the first non-keeper to play as a goalkeeper for a full match, while in 1962 he played in 5 league matches and in a cup match under the posts of yellow-blacks, since neither of the keepers of the club, Serafidis and Fakis were available at the time. In the same position he had a stunning performance in an international friendly against Bolton on 2 May 1962. He stayed in the double-headed eagle until the summer of 1965, winning a campionship in 1963 and a Greek Cup in 1964.

Personal life
Vernezis died in February 1998.

Honours

AEK Athens
Alpha Ethniki: 1962–63
Greek Cup: 1963–64

References

1938 births
1998 deaths
Association football defenders
Footballers from Athens
Greek footballers
AEK Athens F.C. players